Ariadne personata is a butterfly in the family Nymphalidae. It is found in Cameroon and the Democratic Republic of the Congo (Mongala, Uele, Ituri, Tshopo, Tshuapa, Kasai and Sankuru).

References

Butterflies described in 1921
Biblidinae